Thomas Deans Johnston (30 December 1918 – 27 November 1994) was a Scottish professional footballer and manager.

Johnston grew up in Kelso and began his senior career with Edinburgh side St Bernard's before moving south to join Peterborough United in late 1938. He guested for Bourne Town and Northampton Town during the Second World War and signed for Nottingham Forest upon its conclusion. He crossed the Trent to join Notts County in 1947 and played alongside Tommy Lawton.

Originally an inside forward, Johnston latterly developed into a goal-scoring outside left. Following his playing retirement he earned FA coaching qualifications and, in 1956, a coaching position with Birmingham City. His first managerial role was with non-league Heanor Town before a twenty-year career in charge of Rotherham, Grimsby, Huddersfield and York.

Managerial statistics

References

External links

1918 births
1994 deaths
People from Coldstream
Sportspeople from the Scottish Borders
Scottish footballers
Association football midfielders
St Bernard's F.C. players
Peterborough United F.C. players
Nottingham Forest F.C. players
Notts County F.C. players
English Football League players
Scottish football managers
Heanor Town F.C. managers
Rotherham United F.C. managers
Grimsby Town F.C. managers
Huddersfield Town A.F.C. managers
York City F.C. managers
English Football League managers